USS Nahant (SP-1250) was a civilian tugboat that the United States Navy acquired in World War I. She was a tugboat in New York harbor. After the war she was loaned to the City of New York until 1928, when she was disposed of by the Navy.

Building
John H. Dialogue in Camden, New Jersey built the tug as John H. Scully for the Scully Towing and Transportation Line. Scully Towing & Transportation registered her in Philadelphia. Her US official number was 210901 and her code letters were LCSR.

The Luckenbach Steamship Company of New York City acquired the tug and renamed her Luckenbach No. 4.

World War I
On 1 December 1917 the US Navy acquired, renamed her Nahant and gave her the registry number SP-1250. She was commissioned at the beginning of December 1917.

Operating in the 3rd Naval District, Nahant performed towing tasks in New York Harbor for the rest of World War I and into the early post-war era.

Loan to the City of New York
Decommissioning early in 1920, Nahant was transferred to the City of New York and served the Police Department as Service No. 3 and as John F. Harlan.

Disposal
Returned to the Navy in 1928, Nahant was struck from the Naval Register 27 September 1928 and sold to Joseph O’Boyle of New York City 24 December 1928. Subsequently, she enjoyed a lengthy maritime history, changing her name a few times as: Gotham, W. E. Hunt, and Good Fortune. She was scrapped in 1962.

References

Bibliography

External links
 
 
 

1913 ships
Ships built by Dialogue & Company
Steamships of the United States Navy
Tugs of the United States Navy
World War I auxiliary ships of the United States